Lake Holiday is a census-designated place located on Lake Holiday in Northville Township, LaSalle County, Illinois, United States. Its population was 5,687 as of the 2020 census.

The homes on the western banks of the lake are served by the Somonauk Fire Department/EMS and the Somonauk School District, while the eastern banks of the lake are covered by Sandwich municipal services (Fire/EMS, CUSD 430). However, due to the community's location south of the LaSalle-DeKalb county line, neither Sandwich Police nor Somonauk Police have any jurisdiction. Instead, the area is patrolled by local security, which has limited authority. For serious matters, the community is covered by the LaSalle County Sheriff's Department, which has a substation in the Northville Township Building, a few miles to the south of Lake Holiday.

The Lake Holiday CDP includes the neighborhoods surrounding Lake Holiday as well as neighboring Wildwood, which sits to the east of County Highway 3. Lake Holiday was created in the mid-1960s as a lake resort community, with its property owners association being incorporated on July 2, 1965. Wildwood was created around the same time, as a modular home community just across the highway. Starting in the early 1990s, an annex to Wildwood known as "Wildwood South" or "New Wildwood" was created, with completion around 2002. Both subdivisions share a gas station and a small retail area, with a restaurant having been built in 2006-2007 farther north, just south of the county line.

Lake Holiday was created by damming up Somonauk Creek in 1965, on its path south toward its confluence with the Fox River just north of Sheridan.

Geography 

Demographics
As of the 2020 census there were 5,687 people, 1,972 households, and 1,572 families residing in the CDP. The racial makeup of the CDP was 89.84% White, 0.69% African American, 0.25% Native American, 0.33% Asian, 1.72% from other races, and 7.17% from two or more races. Hispanic or Latino of any race were 6.79% of the population.

There were 1,972 households, out of which 57.45% had children under the age of 18 living with them, 68.71% were married couples living together, 8.27% had a female householder with no husband present, and 20.28% were non-families. 15.06% of all households were made up of individuals, and 11.05% had someone living alone who was 65 years of age or older. The average household size was 3.02 and the average family size was 2.72.

The CDP's age distribution consisted of 23.3% under the age of 18, 8.6% from 18 to 24, 19.8% from 25 to 44, 30.2% from 45 to 64, and 18.1% who were 65 years of age or older. The median age was 43.5 years. For every 100 females, there were 108.2 males. For every 100 females age 18 and over, there were 102.6 males.

The median income for a household in the CDP was $82,195, and the median income for a family was $92,009. Males had a median income of $58,903 versus $39,142 for females. The per capita income for the CDP was $32,534. About 4.5% of families and 6.9% of the population were below the poverty line, including 14.3% of those under age 18 and 0.9% of those age 65 or over.

References

1965 establishments in Illinois
Census-designated places in Illinois
Census-designated places in LaSalle County, Illinois
Ottawa, IL Micropolitan Statistical Area